Close Range: Wyoming Stories is a 1999 collection of short stories by E. Annie Proulx, beginning in 1997.  The stories are set in the desolate landscape of rural Wyoming and detail the often grim lives of the protagonists.

The collection was shortlisted for the Pulitzer Prize for Fiction.

The best known story from the collection is "Brokeback Mountain", which was previously published as a 64-page novella in 1998.  The story was the basis for Ang Lee's 2005 film, Brokeback Mountain.

The volume includes 11 short stories:
 "The Half-Skinned Steer"
 "The Mud Below"
 "Job History"
 "The Blood Bay"
 "People in Hell Just Want a Drink of Water"
 "The Bunchgrass Edge of the World"
 "Pair a Spurs"
 "A Lonely Coast"
 "The Governors of Wyoming"
 "55 Miles to the Gas Pump", a brief vignette about a rancher's wife who discovers the corpses of missing women in the attic
 "Brokeback Mountain"

References

External links
Don't Fence Me In: Book review by the New York Times

1999 short story collections
Ambassador Book Award-winning works
American short story collections
Charles Scribner's Sons books
Wyoming culture
Works by Annie Proulx
Wyoming in fiction